Cornhill can refer to:

Cornhill, Aberdeen
Cornhill, Aberdeenshire
Cornhill, Boston, formerly a street in Boston
Cornhill, London, a street and ward in the City of London
Cornhill Magazine, literary publication in print until 1975
Cornhill-on-Tweed, Northumberland
Cornhill Insurance, a United Kingdom insurance company owned by Allianz
Royal Cornhill Hospital, Aberdeen
The Cornhill, Ipswich, a historic town square in Ipswich
Cornhill, Utica, New York
 Gervase de Cornhill (died c. 1183), a medieval sheriff
 Henry de Cornhill (sheriff) (died c. 1193), a medieval sheriff
 Henry de Cornhill (priest), medieval Dean of St Paul's Cathedral
 HM Prison Shepton Mallet, sometimes known as Cornhill.

See also
 Corn Hill (disambiguation)
 Kornhill